Range Life may refer to:

 Range Life (song), a song by Pavement
 Range Life Records, a record label named after the Pavement song